Hypsotropa chionorhabda is a species of snout moth in the genus Hypsotropa. It was described by George Hampson in 1918 and is known from Nigeria, Uganda and South Africa.

References

Moths described in 1918
Anerastiini